RAPTOR,  the Rapid Algorithmic Prototyping Tool for Ordered
Reasoning, is a graphical authoring tool created by Martin C. Carlisle, Terry Wilson, Jeff Humphries and Jason Moore. The software is hosted and maintained by former US Air Force Academy and current Texas A&M University professor Martin Carlisle.

RAPTOR allows users to write and execute programs using flowcharts. The simple language and graphical components of RAPTOR are designed to teach the major ideas of computer programming to students. It is typically used in academics to teach introductory programming concepts as well.

See also 

Other educational programming languages include:

 Alice (software)
 Flowgorithm
 LARP
 Visual Logic
 Scratch

References

External links 

 

Visual programming languages
Educational programming languages
Free educational software
Pedagogic integrated development environments